Gisele Mayordo (born 30 October 1988), known by her ring name Gisele Shaw, is a Filipino professional wrestler currently signed to Impact Wrestling. She is known for her work in England with various promotions including Progress Wrestling and Revolution Pro Wrestling, having held the Women's Championship in both promotions. She has also wrestled in American promotions such as Ring of Honor and Women of Wrestling.

Professional wrestling career

Early career
Mayordo made her pro wrestling debut during January 2015 under the ring name Gisele Shaw. She wrestled extensively in Canada in promotions including High Impact Wrestling, Border City Wrestling, All-Star Wrestling, Prairie Wrestling Alliance and others. She won her first title while in Pro Wrestling Eclipse, where she captured the PWE Flame Championship on February 10, 2018 at PWE February Frenzy, defeating Stacy Thibault. She lost the title nine months later at PWE November Bash in a three-way match against Beautiful Beaa and Jewells Malone. She went on to win her second title in Crossfire Wrestling, where she won the CW Women's Championship in a triple-threat match against Beautiful Beaa and Jody Threat.

Revolution Pro Wrestling (2019–2021) 
On June 9, 2019, Shaw made her Revolution Pro Wrestling debut at RevPro Live in Southampton 8, defeating Zoe Lucas. After losing her second RevPro match to Seleziya Sparx, Shaw began a six match winning streak from October to December as she defeated the likes of Mercedes Martinez, Dani Luna, Tessa Blanchard, Bobbi Tyler, Shanna, and lastly Zan Phoenix. Due to this impressive two month long winning streak, Shaw earned an opportunity to face Undisputed British Women's Champion Zoe Lucas at RevPro New Year's Revolution but was unsuccessful in her first attempt. Despite her shortcomings, Shaw earned another opportunity for the championship after winning a #1 contenders four way on January 10, 2020, that also involved Debbie Keitel, Shanna, and Kasey Owens. Contrary to her first attempt, Shaw defeated champion Zoe Lucas on February 14, to become new British Women's Champion for the first time. Over the course of her 359 day title reign, Shaw defended her title against the likes of Bobbi Tyler, Bea Priestley, Aleah James, Little Miss Roxxy, and Jamie Hayter. The latter of whom ended Shaw's near year long reign as champion on February 7, 2021. 

Despite losing the British Women's Championship, after Hayter no-showed a RevPro event to attend a WWE tryout, Shaw defeated Zoe Lucas for the newly vacated championship at RevPro Live At The Cockpit 51, thus becoming a two time champion. While champion, Shaw entered into the Queen of the Ring tournament where she made it all the way to the semifinals where she lost to Hyan. After failing to win the tournament, Shaw began defending the British Women's Championship regularly again as she defeated the likes of Hyan (twice), Mariah May, and Lizzy Evo. Shaw's second reign as champion came to an end at 126 days after losing to Alex Windsor at RevPro Live At The NOTpit 55 on November 7. As of February 2022, this was Shaw's last match in RevPro.

Progress Wrestling (2019–present) 
Shaw made her Progress Wrestling debut at Chapter 93: Cheer Up Juice, in a losing effort against Dani Luna in a four way which also included Jody Threat and Yuu. Her next match was also a losing effort as she and Luna challenged Jinny for the Progress World Women's Championship in a three way match. Shaw picked up her first win in Progress on February 23, 2020 against Chakara before going on a year long hiatus.

Shaw made her return to Progress on February 27, 2021, at Chapter 105: Bring The Thunder, losing to Kanji in a Progress Women;s Championship #1 contender's match also involving Taonga, Millie McKenzie, Lana Austin, Mercedez Blaze and Alexxis Flacon. Soon after, due to COVID-19 travel restrictions, reigning Progress World Women's Championship Jinny was forced to vacate the title. Therefore a three match series between Shaw and Kanji was announced to determine the new champion. Shaw lost the series 1-2 against Kanji. 

After Kanji was forced to relinquish the Progress World Women's Championship, it was announced Gisele Shaw, Alexxis Falcon and Mercedez Blaze would compete for the vacant title at Chapter 117: Making Diamonds on August 14, 2021. At the event, Shaw defeated Blaze and Falcon to become the Progress World Women's Champion for the first time. Following this, Shaw began defending the title successfully against the likes of Laura Di Matteo, Rhio, Skye Smitson, Debbie Keitel, and Alexxis Falcon (twice).

Women of Wrestling (2019)
Shaw made her Women of Wrestling debut on October 11, 2019, as a masked wrestler named Azteca. Later, she removed the mask and changed her ring name to Reyna Reyes, "the pearl of the Philippines". Throughout her tenure with WOW, she competed in a series of matches including singles matches against Kobra Moon, Jessie Jones, Holidead and The Beast. She later teamed with Princess Aussie in a tag match against Holidead & Voodoo Doll.

Impact Wrestling (2018, 2022–present)
On March 3, 2018, Shaw represented Canada's Border City Wrestling in the co-produced pay-per-view event One Night Only: March Breakdown, losing to Impact Wrestling legend Madison Rayne. Five months later, Shaw represented Destiny World Wrestling on August 25 at One Night Only: Bad Intentions, competing for the Impact Knockouts Championship held by Tessa Blanchard. Two months later, Shaw once again represented Border City Wrestling during the co-produced event One Night Only: BCW 25th Anniversary, where she lost a singles match against Impact representative Kiera Hogan.

Starting on the January 20, 2022 episode of Impact!, a vignette showcasing the debut of a new knockout calling herself "The Quintessential Diva". The next week's vignette revealed the new knockout to be Gisele Shaw as the vignettes continued for the next two weeks. On the February 10, episode of Before the Impact!, Shaw made her official debut confronting fellow newcomer Lady Frost after her match with Alisha Edwards. During that same episode it was announced that Shaw would make her official in-ring debut against Frost on the February 17 episode of Impact!.

Personal life
Mayordo transitioned from male to female at age 22 and came out as a transgender woman at the Pride Toronto event on June 24, 2022, at age 33.

Championships and accomplishments
 Crossfire Wrestling
 CW Women's Championship (1 time)
 Fierce Females
 Fierce Females Championship (1 time, current)
 Ironfist Wrestling
 Ironfist Women's Championship (1 time)
 Progress Wrestling
 Progress World Women's Championship (1 time)
 Pro Wrestling Eclipse
 PWE Flame Championship (1 time)
 Pro-Wrestling: EVE
 Pro-Wrestling: EVE Tag Team Championship (1 time) – with Emersyn Jayne
 Pro Wrestling Illustrated
 Ranked No. 19 of the top 150 female wrestlers in the PWI Women's 150 in 2021
 Revolution Pro Wrestling
 Undisputed British Women's Championship (2 times)

References

External links

 Gisele Shaw's Impact Wrestling profile
 

1988 births
Living people
Filipino female professional wrestlers
Sportspeople from Cebu
Filipino expatriate sportspeople in the United Kingdom
Filipino expatriate sportspeople in the United States
LGBT professional wrestlers
Filipino LGBT sportspeople
Transgender sportswomen
Progress Wrestling World Women's Champions
Undisputed British Women's Champions